Over the Edge may refer to:

Film and television
 Over the Edge (film), a 1979 drama starring Matt Dillon
 Over the Edge: In Your House, 1998 professional wrestling pay-per-view
 Over the Edge (1999), a professional wrestling pay-per-view event
 WWF Over the Edge, a professional wrestling pay-per-view event series
 "Over the Edge" (The New Batman Adventures), an episode of The New Batman Adventures

Books
 Over the Edge (anthology), edited by August Derleth
 Over the Edge (book), a 2002 nonfiction book by Greg Child
 Over the Edge (Jonathan Kellerman novel)

Music
Over the Edge (Hurricane album), 1988
Over the Edge (Mickey Thomas album), 2004
Over the Edge (Wipers album), 1983
"Over the Edge" (Sarah Jarosz song), 2013
"Over the Edge" (Kayzo and Gammer song), 2017
"Over the Edge", a song by Fu Manchu from the 2000 album King of the Road
"Over the Edge", a song by L.A. Guns from the 1991 album Hollywood Vampires
"Over the Edge", a song by Status Quo from their 1980 album Just Supposin'
"Over the Edge", a song by The Almighty from their 1993 album Powertrippin'

Other uses
 Over the Edge (game), a role-playing game
 Over the Edge (radio program), a radio program created by Don Joyce
 Over the Edge (Zimbabwe), a Zimbabwean theatre company

See also
 Over the Hedge (disambiguation), a comic strip and related media
 On the Edge (disambiguation)
 Edge (disambiguation)
 OTE (disambiguation)
 The Edge (disambiguation)